Joshua Dubau (born 4 June 1996) is a French cyclist, who competes in cyclo-cross and cross-country mountain biking.

Major results

Cyclo-cross

2013–2014
 UCI Under-23 World Cup
2nd Valkenburg
2015–2016
 1st Overall Under-23 Coupe de France
2nd Flamanville
2nd Albi
2016–2017
 3rd Overall Under-23 Coupe de France
2nd Erôme Gervans
 3rd National Under-23 Championships
 6th UCI Under-23 World Championships
2017–2018
 1st Overall Under-23 Coupe de France
1st La Mézière
1st Besançon
 2nd National Under-23 Championships
 2nd Pétange
 UCI Under-23 World Cup
3rd Grand Prix Nommay
 4th UEC European Under-23 Championships
2018–2019
 2nd Troyes-Rosière
 Coupe de France
3rd Pierric
3rd Razès
2019–2020
 1st Boulzicourt Ardennes
 2nd National Championships
 2nd Contern
2020–2021
 2nd National Championships
 9th UEC European Championships
2021–2022
 1st  National Championships
 1st Overall Coupe de France
1st Quelnuec I
1st Quelnuec II
1st Pierric I
1st Bagnoles de l'Orne II
1st Troyes II
2nd Bagnoles de l'Orne I
2nd Pierric II
3rd Troyes I
 1st Jablines
 1st Lutterbach Pfastatt
 1st Boulzicourt
 2nd Pétange
 3rd La Grandville
2022–2023
 1st Pétange
 1st Auxerre
 1st La Grandville
 2nd Gernelle
 2nd Boulzicourt Ardennes
 3rd Overall Coupe de France
2nd Camors II
2nd Nommay I
 3rd National Championships

Mountain Bike

2018
 1st  Cross-country, UEC European Under-23 Championships
 1st  Cross-country, National Under-23 Championships
 2nd Overall UCI Under-23 XCO World Cup
1st Albstadt
1st Vallnord
2nd Val di Sole
 French Cup
1st Les Menuires
3rd Ussel
2019
 French Cup
2nd Plœuc-l'Hermitage
 3rd Short track, National Championships
2020
 2nd Marathon, National Championships
2021
 French Cup
1st Les Menuires
3rd Guéret
2022
 French Cup
1st Guéret
 3rd Short track, National Championships

References

External links

1996 births
Living people
French male cyclists
Sportspeople from Reims
French mountain bikers
Cyclo-cross cyclists
Cyclists from Grand Est